Votrax International, Inc. (originally the Vocal division of Federal Screw Works), or just Votrax, was a speech synthesis company located in the Detroit, Michigan area from 1971 to 1996. It began as a division of Federal Screw Works from 1971 to 1973. In 1974, it was given the Votrax name (taken from the name of its first commercial product, the model VS4 "Votrax") and moved to Troy, Michigan and, in 1980, split off of its parent company entirely and became Votrax International, Inc., which produced speech products up until 1984.

In 1984, the company restructured itself as a commercial phone/speech audio-response/auto-answering systems company after downsizing some of the staff. In 1987, Votrax merged with Vynet Corp., a voice-recognition prompt pioneer. It remained Votrax inc. until about 1992, when it was renamed to or otherwise merged with Vysion, Inc., a maker of security cameras and other related devices. It remained 'Vysion Inc.' until the company declared bankruptcy in June 1994 following a court battle patent litigation loss against PATCO inc., and from the remains of the old company, restructured itself as 'Maxxar' inc in 1995. Maxxar was acquired by Open Solutions, LLC (then Open Solutions, Inc.), on February 24, 2004, and Open Solutions, LLC was acquired by Fiserv, Inc. on January 14, 2013. Maxxar owned the rights to the Votrax name, but the trademark lapsed on March 11, 2016.

History 

All the Votrax speech synthesizers owe their existence to the speech synthesizer design created in 1970 by Richard T. Gagnon. After coming up with a viable design scheme in his basement laboratory, Gagnon licensed it to Federal Screw Works, whom he was working for at the time, and they continued development of his original design. This became the "Vocal division of Federal Screw Works".

In 1984, Votrax either declared bankruptcy or came close to doing so, and restructured itself as a commercial phone-interface provider, and hence produced no new consumer products. The later commercial-only products are not listed on the below list because literature about these seems to have been of limited distribution and has not yet been found. During the restructuring, much of the existing staff was downsized off, including Tim Gargagliano and Kathryn F. Gargagliano, who along with two other former Votrax employees, Art Velthoven and Dale McDaniel, started Artic Technologies in 1984. Tim and Kate had earlier written an article about the SC-01 for BYTE magazine.
In 1987, Votrax merged with Vynet Corp and the product lines of both companies were combined.

Products 
Votrax was responsible for designing and manufacturing several important early speech synthesizer back-ends, and several widely used integrated circuit phoneme synthesizers. Votrax produced speech backend modules and cards for various personal computers, and worked with the United States Naval Research Laboratory (NRL) to create an extensible speech frontend system. Votrax's speech technology was also used by 3rd parties in several arcade games, Gottlieb System 80 pinball machines, and talking terminals. A Votrax synthesizer was used as part of the text-to-speech subsystem of the first generation Kurzweil Reading Machine for the Blind.

During the 1970s, Votrax produced a series of discrete speech synthesizers, with epoxy-coated boards to thwart people copying their designs. In 1980, they designed and manufactured an integrated circuit speech synthesizer called the SC-01. This IC proved very popular in the third party market, and was produced until at least 1984.  It was succeeded by the somewhat more dynamic SC-02, also known as the SSI-263P. From the beginning of SC-02 production, Silicon Systems Inc. (now part of Texas Instruments) manufactured the SC-02 chip under the product number SSI-263P, and this was apparently later adopted as the official name of the IC. Votrax continued to intermittently sell SC-01-A and SC-02 synthesis chips, and Personal Speech System text to speech units until at least October 1990.

Since early in its life, Votrax specialized in making phoneme-based speech synthesizers and text-to-speech algorithms. The popular United States Naval Research Laboratory, or "NRL" text-to-phoneme algorithm was developed by a collaboration between Votrax and the NRL in 1973. This algorithm and variants of it were used on a number of text-to-speech devices, such as the Votrax Type 'N Talk, the Votrax Personal Speech System, and the General Instruments CTS256A-AL2 text-to-allophone chip. A good rundown of the NRL algorithm can be found under reference.

Votrax also supplied the SC-02 speech chip used in the amateur radio 'DOVE-OSCAR 17' or 'DOVE' Microsatellite.

M. D. McIlroy used a "Votrax" branded "Federal Screw Works" synth, a single potted block, as the 'Screw Works' backend for the Unix 'speak' command on Unix V1/2/3/4 in 1972/1973. Details of the algorithm were later (1974) described in his paper "Synthetic English speech by rule", Bell Telephone Laboratories Computer Science Technical Report #14, which is available on his personal site's publications page.

The most typical commercial products are two boxes named "Type 'N Talk (TNT)" and "Personal Speech System (PSS)".

The first essentially consist of a board with Motorola MC6802 microprocessor, a 4K ROM, some 74's TTL chip, a Motorola 6850 (ACIA) for RS-232 communication. And of course an SC-01A synth chip.

The second one, on surface, has 2K RAM chips and an 8K EPROM which holds "non-critical" data.  Inside the epoxy-covered blackbox there are 4 small 74s' TTL chips, a  Zilog Z80 microprocessor, and two 8K EPROM and the synth chip. It communicate via RS-232.

List of products

Official 

1971:
 VS1 (prototype only, Gagnon's personal model)
 VS2 (prototype only)
 VS3 (prototype only)
1972:
 VS4 (first model sold by Federal Screw Works, was sold under the product name "Votrax")
 VS5
 VS6 (design prototypes only)
1973:
 VS6
1973-1975:
 VS6.1
 VS6.2
 VS6.3
 VS6.G
1975:
 VS6.G2
1977:
 VS6.4
1978
 ML-1 (large rack-mount or standalone unit with four potted boards inside)
 ML-1ES (ML-1 with added Spanish-specific phonemes)
 ML-2ES
1978-1980:
 VSA
 SVA (first self-contained speech synthesizer, with a 6800 core running the NRL frontend)
 VSC
 VSK (smallish potted module, used on an unmarked rs-232 carrier board, among other places. runs on +-12VDC.)
 VSL (smallish potted module, used on an Ohio Scientific expansion board, Model 567 among other places. runs on +-8VDC; almost identical to and interface compatible with VSK)
1980:
 CDS1 (emulation of SC-01 running on a mainframe)
 VSB
 SC-01 (IC, very similar to VSL except all on one chip. Made as early as 49th week of '80, and as late as the 8th week of '81)
 VSM/1 (SC-01 based, has mc6800 running "voxOS")
 Votrax 'circuit cards' (SC-01 based)
 Speech PAC (SC-01 based) (also mentioned at )
 Type 'N Talk
1981:
 SC-01-A (IC, internal ROM change of SC-01, Made as early as the 12th week of 1981, and as late as the 51st week of 1988)
 Type 'N Talk (SC-01-A based later model)
1982:
 Personal Speech System (SC-01-A based)
1983:
 SC-02/SSI-263P (IC, Made as early as 3rd week of 1984, as late as 6th week of 1984)
1984:
 Votalker 1B (IBM PC ISA card, SC-02 based)
 Votalker AP (Apple II card, SC-02 based)
 Votalker C64 (Commodore 64 cartridge, SC-02 based)
1985:
 SSI-263AP (bugfix of SSI-263P, made as early as 45th week of 1985 until as late as 35th week 1995, was rebadged in various ways, such as 'ARTIC 263')
1987:
 Votalker IB 2000 (Very Small Production Run), 6511 based software ISA card for IBM-PC.

Third party 
1978:
 Phonic Mirror 'HandiVoice' (VSK)
1979:
 Tandy/Radio Shack TRS-80 Voice Synthesizer (slightly stripped down VSL, on a larger circuit board, transition filters are potted)
 Enabling Technologies 'Audibraille' (Simple Microcomputer with 128k mem) (SVA speech core)
1980:
 Colorware's Real Talker voice synthesizer (SC-01) for the TRS-80 Color Computer
 Maryland Computer Services 'Total Talk' (Modified HP-2621 Terminal) (VSB + McIlroy algorithm)
 Automated Functions 'VERT' (VSB + McIlroy algorithm)
 Triformatlon System 'FSST-3' (Modified Zenith Z-19 Terminal) (VSA + NRL algorithm)
 IBM 'Audio Typing unit'
 Midway Wizard of Wor arcade machine (SC-01)
1981:
 Gottlieb pinball machines (SC-01): Black Hole, Devil's Dare, Mars God of War, Volcano
 Microvox/Intex Talker (SC-01-A)
 Alien Group Voice Synthesizer
 Midway Gorf arcade machine (SC-01)
1982:
 Gottlieb Q*bert and Reactor arcade machines (SC-01)
 Gottlieb pinball machines: Rocky, Striker
 Alpha Products 'VS100' (for TRS-80 Model III) (SC-01-A)
 Sweet Micro Systems Mockingboard Speech I and 'Sound/Speech I' (SC-01-A)
 Heathkit HERO 1 (ET-18) Robot Votrax SC-01 speech synthesizer
1983:
 Sweet Micro Systems Mockingboard B & C (SC-02/SSI-263P)
 Gottlieb Q*bert's Quest pinball machine
 Tecmar PC-Mate Speech Master ISA card (SC-01-A + National Semiconductor Digitalker)
1984-96:
 Artic Technologies (several cards using SC-01-A, SC-02 and SSI-263AP, rebadged as "ARTIC 263")

Support in software 
Scott Adams, who pioneered text adventures for home computers, implemented support of Votrax speech in VIC-20 porting of some of his adventures, like Adventureland (VIC-1914) and Voodoo Castle (VIC-1918).

Patents 
 US Patent 3,836,717 (32 phonemes, 11/12 parameters, VS3/4 w/passive filters)
 US Patent 3,908,085 (64 phonemes, 16 parameters, VS5/VS6 w/active filters)
 US Patent 4,128,737 (128 phonemes, 16 parameters, ML-1 series w/digital rate control)
 US Patent 4,130,730 (64 phonemes, 12 parameters, 'low-cost' 1818C and VSK/VSL (and TRS-80 Voice Synthesizer))
 US Patent 4,264,783 (64 phonemes, 12 parameters, VSA/VSB w/digital interpolation and a different vocal tract filter design)
 US Patent 4,301,328 (128 phonemes, continuation of 4,128,737, additional rate control claims)
 US Patent RE30,991 (reissue of 4,130,730 w/2 more claims)
 US Patent 4,532,495 (A speech encoding system, 4-bit DPCM)
 US Patent 4,470,150 (64 phonemes, 12 parameters, unreleased product in 'low-cost' 1818C design w/more random timing/inflection for realism)
 US Patent 4,433,210 (64 phonemes, SC-01 prototype)
 US Patent 4,829,573 (64 phonemes, Software Synthesizer using a different technology coded for an R6511 microprocessor (a Rockwell derivative of the MOS Technology 6502)
 International Patents CA1124865, CA1124866, CA1171179, DE2840596, CH625900

References

External links 
 Gagnon's IEEE paper describing the basics behind 'votrax speech'
 DEC PDP-11 implementation of NRL algorithm
 Intelligibility comparison of Votrax VS6 and ML-1 versus MITalk and an LPC algorithm
 Office voice response system using a Votrax SVA
 NASA/Sensory Aids Foundation Blind Programmable Calculator using Votrax VS-6, 1977
 Rueter's ACM paper on APL programming a "Votrax" (VS4) unit
 Votrax SC-01-A connected to the internet: send your own phoneme data and hear it spoken
 Votrax ML-1 Reverse-engineering
 Votrax SC-02 datasheet cover
 BYTE magazine article by two Votrax Employees who later married, left the company in 1983 and along with a few other former Votrax employees started ARTIC Technologies
 Alternate version of one of the sources

Defunct technology companies of the United States
Speech synthesis